Folk dances of Sindh are the traditional dances of the Sindhi people, which are indigenous to Sindh region which is now in Pakistan. These dances are performed at various events including marriages, cultural purposes and for ceremonies.

History 
Dances in early-medieval Sindh had great prominence which attributed to social and religious life, the scriptures from Mohenjo Daro have proved this fact. The dancing girl from Mohen jo Daro Sambara is quite famous.

Dances 
Some popular dances include:
 Jamalo: the notable Sindhi dance which is celebrated by Sindhis across the world.
 Jhumar/Jhumir: Performed on weddings and on special occasions.
 Chej Although Chej has seen decline in Sindh but it remains popular among Sindhi Hindus and diaspora, Chej is only performed by men.
 Bhagat: is a dance performed by professionals to entertain visiting people.
 Dhamaal: is a mystical dance performed by Dervish.
 Doka/Dandio: Dance performed using sticks.
 Charuri: Performed in thar.
 Muhana Dance: A dance performed by fishermen and fisherwomen of Sindh. 
 Rasudo: Dance of nangarparker.
 Matiku: one of folk dance of thar region of Sindh.

Overview 
Dances of Sindh include the famous Ho-Jamalo and Dhammal.

Common dances include Jhumar/Jhumir (Different from Jhumar dance of South Punjab), Kafelo, Dhamaal and Jhamelo however none of these have survived as much as Ho-Jamalo. In marriages, a special type of song is produced these are known as Ladas/Sehra/Geech and these are sung to celebrate the occasion of marriage, birth and on other special occasions, these are mostly performed by women.

References

External links 
 Sindhi Sangat
 STDC
 Sindhi dance and music
Sindh
Sindhi culture
Dances of Pakistan
India dance-related lists
Folk dances